The 1995 Christchurch mayoral election was part of the New Zealand local elections held that same year. In 1995, election were held for the Mayor of Christchurch plus other local government positions. The polling was conducted using the standard first-past-the-post electoral method.

Background
Mayor Vicki Buck was re-elected for a third term with a huge majority following the absence of a serious challenger. She was again opposed only by minor party candidates.

Results
The following table gives the election results:

Ward results
Candidates were also elected from wards to the Christchurch City Council.

References

Mayoral elections in Christchurch
1995 elections in New Zealand
Politics of Christchurch
October 1995 events in Oceania
1990s in Christchurch